Al-Sakhina, was a Palestinian Arab village in the District of Baysan. It was located five kilometres west of Baysan on the Jalud River on its way to the Jordan River. It was depopulated by the Israel Defense Forces during the 1947–1948 Civil War in Mandatory Palestine on May 12, 1948, as part of Operation Gideon.

History
At the time of the 1931 census, al-Sakhina had 78 occupied houses and a population of 372 Muslims, one Christian, and one Jew. In 1936, a Jewish kibbutz, Tel Amal (later renamed Nir David), was established slightly to the south.

The village and kibbutz together had 530 Muslims and 290 Jews in the 1945 statistics.  Arabs used a total of 260 dunums  for cereals and 828 dunums were irrigated or used for plantations, while Nir David and Al-Sakhina together had a total of 340 dunams as built-up and non-cultivable land.

References

Bibliography

External links
Welcome To al-Sakhina
al-Sakhina,  Zochrot
Survey of Western Palestine, map 9:   IAA, Wikimedia commons
Al-Sakhina, from the Khalil Sakakini Cultural Center

Arab villages depopulated during the 1948 Arab–Israeli War